Iwitahi is a rural locality in the Taupo District and Bay of Plenty Region of New Zealand's North Island. It is situated on State Highway 5 between Taupo and Napier, about 20 km southeast of Taupo. It is a farming area, largely surrounded by forest, close to the plains of the upper Rangitaiki River. The locality was formerly known as Iwatahi.

References

Taupō District
Populated places in the Bay of Plenty Region